Phạm Văn Cường (born 19 July 1990) is a Vietnamese footballer who plays as a goalkeeper for V-League (Vietnam) club

Honours
Quảng Nam
V.League 1: 2017
Vietnamese National Cup: Runner-up 2019
Vietnamese Super Cup: 2018

External links

References

1990 births
Living people
Vietnamese footballers
Binh Dinh FC players
Quang Nam FC players
V.League 1 players
People from Nghệ An province
Association football goalkeepers